The 1968 Oakland Raiders season was the team's ninth season in both Oakland and the American Football League. It saw the team try to improve upon its 13–1 record from 1967. They ultimately finished one game short of matching that year's result; their 12–2 finish still ensured that they would lead the league in wins for a second consecutive year. Led by third-year head coach John Rauch, they tied with Kansas City for the division title, which was settled by an unscheduled tiebreaker playoff, won 41–6 by the Raiders in Oakland. 

The season featured a growing rivalry between the Raiders and the New York Jets, led by fourth-year superstar quarterback Joe Namath. The teams met twice in 1968: the first was on November 17 in Oakland, which saw the Raiders complete a stunning fourth-quarter comeback over the Jets, scoring two touchdowns in nine seconds. Known today as the Heidi Game, it remains one of the most famous in AFL/NFL history. They paired up six weeks later in the AFL Championship Game in New York, where Namath's Jets emerged victorious in a 27–23 upset on December 29. Two weeks later, the Jets upset the Baltimore Colts in Super Bowl III.

The 1968 season is also notable for a few changes to the team including the additions of George Atkinson, Art Shell, and Ken Stabler. All three won a championship with the Raiders eight years later in Super Bowl XI. Additionally, Shell in 1989, and Stabler in 2016, were both inducted into the Pro Football Hall of Fame.

Offseason

NFL Draft

Roster

Schedule

 Saturday night (September 21), Thursday (November 28: Thanksgiving)

Postseason

Standings

Game summaries

Week 11 vs. Jets

Week 12 vs. Bills

Staff

Head coach: John Rauch

Assistants: John Polonchek (RB), Ollie Spencer (OL), Tom Dahms (DL), John Madden (LB), Charlie Sumner (DB), Marv Marinovich (Str)

References

Oakland
Oakland Raiders seasons
Oakland